Ángel López Vázquez (born 16 January 1992 in Madrid) is a Spanish rugby sevens player. He also was part of the team that won the 2016 Men's Rugby Sevens Final Olympic Qualification Tournament.

He has completed his studies in Medicine and currently works as an ophthalmologist at Hospital Ramón y Cajal in Madrid.

References

External links
 
 

1992 births
Living people
Rugby sevens players at the 2016 Summer Olympics
Olympic rugby sevens players of Spain
Spain international rugby sevens players
Sportspeople from Madrid
Rugby union players from the Community of Madrid